Sfax is a city in Tunisia.

Sfax may also refer to:
 Sfax (crater), on Mars
 
 
 Sfax Governorate, Tunisia
 University of Sfax